Oluwatoyin (Toyin) Asojo is  Associate Professor and chair of the Department of Chemistry and Biochemistry at Hampton University. She was formerly an Associate Professor of Pediatrics-Tropical medicine at the Baylor College of Medicine. She works at "the interface of math, chemistry, biology, computation." She is a crystallographer and interested in structural studies of proteins from neglected tropical disease pathogens.

Early life and education 
Asojo was born in Oyo State Nigeria, and spent her early life at the University of Ibadan Campus. She was a member of the Ibadan poetry club and volunteered at an orphanage whilst at school. Her father was a chief laboratory scientist at the University of Ibadan, and she would spend several hours a week in the lab. She attended the International School Ibadan and applied for a United World College scholarship that would allow her to study abroad, and was one of only seven from ~10,000 applicants to be selected. She earned an International Baccalaureate diploma in 1989 from Pearson College UWC. In 1993 Asojo completed a Dual Honours degree at Trent University, majoring in Chemistry and Economics.  Asojo earned a PhD at the University of Houston in 1999.

Research 
Asojo has conducted research in industry, academia and government. After graduating, Asojo was appointed a postdoctoral fellow at the  National Cancer Institute. She spent a year as a staff scientist at Tibotec in Rockville, Maryland.  In 2003, Asojo joined University of Nebraska Medical Center as an Assistant Professor. She simultaneously managed the X-Ray crystallography facility at Eppley Institute for Research in Cancer and Allied Diseases. Here she studied membrane proteins involved in multi-drug resistance. She was awarded two National Institutes of Health grants in 2005, studying alternative treatments to the Hookworm infection. She held an adjunct position at Olabisi Onabanjo University.

Asojo is now at Hampton University in Hampton, VA where she is an associate professor of Chemistry and Biochemistry. Asojo was previously based at the Baylor College of Medicine, where her lab are dedicated to the production, purification and crystallization of proteins. She shares equipment with the Sabin Vaccine Institute. Since 2001 she has coordinated summer research projects for disadvantaged high school students through the American Chemical Society Project SEED.  She won the Carnegie African Diaspora Fellowship in 2016. Since 2014, Asojo has been an editor for Nature's Scientific Reports and an associate editor specializing in crystallography for BMC Structural Biology.

Awards and honors 

2016 - Fulbright specialist

2016 - Society for Science & the Public Science Advocate Grant program

2016 - Carnegie African Diaspora Fellowship in 2016.

2017 - Baylor College of Medicine Norton Rose Fulbright Faculty Excellence Award in Teaching

Selected publications 
Asojo's most cited publications include:

 Asojo, O. A., Goud, G., Dhar, K., Loukas, A., Zhan, B., Deumic, V., ... & Hotez, P. J. (2005). X-ray structure of Na-ASP-2, a pathogenesis-related-1 protein from the nematode parasite, Necator americanus, and a vaccine antigen for human hookworm infection. Journal of molecular biology, 346(3), 801-814.(Cited 165 times, according to Google Scholar  ) 
 Asojo, O. A., Gulnik, S. V., Afonina, E., Yu, B., Ellman, J. A., Haque, T. S., & Silva, A. M. (2003). Novel uncomplexed and complexed structures of plasmepsin II, an aspartic protease from Plasmodium falciparum. Journal of molecular biology, 327(1), 173-181. (Cited 152 times, according to Google Scholar. )  
 Nachon, F., Asojo, O. A., Borgstahl, G. E., Masson, P., & Lockridge, O. (2005). Role of water in aging of human butyrylcholinesterase inhibited by echothiophate: the crystal structure suggests two alternative mechanisms of aging. Biochemistry, 44(4), 1154-1162. (Cited 116  times, according to Google Scholar. )  
 Asojo, O. A., Afonina, E., Gulnik, S. V., Yu, B., Erickson, J. W., Randad, R., ... & Silva, A. M. (2002). Structures of Ser205 mutant plasmepsin II from Plasmodium falciparum at 1.8 Å in complex with the inhibitors rs367 and rs370. Acta Crystallographica Section D: Biological Crystallography, 58(12), 2001-2008.
 Hotez, P. J., Asojo, O. A., & Adesina, A. M. (2012). Nigeria:“Ground Zero" for the High Prevalence Neglected Tropical Diseases. PLoS Negl Trop Dis, 6(7), e1600.

References

External links

Living people
University of Houston faculty
University of Houston alumni
Trent University alumni
Nigerian women scientists
Cancer researchers
Nigerian women academics
Yoruba women academics
International School, Ibadan alumni
People educated at a United World College
Yoruba women scientists
Hampton University faculty
Nigerian emigrants to the United States
Nigerian expatriates in Canada
University of Nebraska faculty
20th-century births
Academic staff of Olabisi Onabanjo University
Nigerian medical researchers
Year of birth missing (living people)